True Lies is a 1994 American spy action comedy film written and directed by James Cameron, based on the 1991 French comedy film La Totale!. The film stars Arnold Schwarzenegger as Harry Tasker, a U.S. government agent who struggles to balance his double life as a spy with his familial duties. Jamie Lee Curtis, Tom Arnold, Bill Paxton, Art Malik, and Tia Carrere star in supporting roles. True Lies was the first Lightstorm Entertainment project to be distributed under Cameron's multimillion-dollar production deal with 20th Century Fox, as well as the first major production for the visual effects company Digital Domain, which was co-founded by Cameron. It was also the first film to cost $100 million.

True Lies received mostly positive reviews from critics, and ultimately grossed $378 million worldwide at the box office, becoming the third-highest-grossing film of 1994. For her performance, Curtis won the Golden Globe Award for Best Actress – Motion Picture Musical or Comedy and the Saturn Award for Best Actress, while Cameron won the Saturn Award for Best Director. It was also nominated at the Academy Awards and BAFTAs in the Best Visual Effects category, and also for seven Saturn Awards.

Plot
Harry Tasker leads a double life: to his legal secretary wife, Helen, and his rebellious daughter Dana, he is a boring salesman for business software often away on business trips, but in actuality, he is a secret agent for Omega Sector, a top-secret U.S. counterterrorism agency. Harry, along with his teammates Albert "Gib" Gibson and Faisil, infiltrate a party in Switzerland hosted by billionaire Jamal Khaled, where Harry meets beautiful art dealer Juno Skinner. Eventually they learn that Juno is not only Khaled's art dealer, but that she is being paid by an Islamic terrorism group called "Crimson Jihad", led by Salim Abu Aziz. Harry visits her undercover as a potential buyer to learn more, leading Aziz and his men to attempt to kill him. Harry fights them off, but loses Aziz in pursuit. As a result, he misses the birthday party that Helen and Dana had planned for him.

Harry goes to Helen's office the next day to smooth matters over and surprise her for lunch, but overhears her making secret arrangements to meet a man named Simon. Suspecting Helen is having an affair, he uses Omega Sector resources to learn that Simon is a used car salesman who pretends to be a covert agent to seduce women. In disguise, Harry and other Omega agents kidnap Helen and Simon. After terrifying Simon into keeping away from Helen, Harry and Gib interrogate Helen using a voice masking device and learn that she is desperately seeking adventure because of Harry's constant absences. Harry thus arranges for Helen to participate in a staged spy mission, where she is to seduce a mysterious figure (who is actually Harry himself) and plant a bug in his hotel room. Aziz's men suddenly burst in, kidnap the couple, and take them to an island in the Florida Keys.

On the island, Harry's suspicions about Juno are confirmed: Crimson Jihad paid her to help them smuggle four stolen MIRV nuclear warheads into the country by hiding them in priceless antique statues. Aziz demands that the United States remove all U.S. military forces from the Persian Gulf forever or else he will detonate a warhead each week in a major U.S. city. He also says he will detonate one warhead on the uninhabited island to demonstrate that Crimson Jihad is a nuclear power. Before he and Helen are tortured, Harry is administered a truth serum and confesses his double life to Helen. They escape to watch as one warhead is set to explode in 90 minutes and the others are loaded onto vehicles to be taken into the U.S. via the Overseas Highway, thus bypassing U.S. Customs. Harry and Helen get separated in the ensuing melee where Harry kills most of the terrorists, but Aziz gets away with one of the warheads. Helen is caught by Juno and taken in a limousine following the convoy. Gib and other Omega agents pick up Harry and they use two Marine Harrier jump jets to intercept the convoy by destroying part of the Seven Mile Bridge. Harry rescues Helen from Juno's limo before it goes off the Highway and topples into the water, killing Juno in the process.

The warhead left on the island detonates in front of the public without killing anyone. Gib tells Harry that Aziz and his men are holding Dana hostage in a downtown Miami skyscraper and are threatening to detonate their last warhead. Harry commandeers one of the Harriers to rescue his daughter. Faisil gets into the building by posing as part of a news team requested by Aziz. When Faisil kills several of Aziz's men, Dana steals the missile control key and flees to the building's roof, eventually climbing a tower crane and threatening to drop the key to the street. Aziz pursues and nearly catches her before Harry arrives. Harry rescues a shocked Dana, and after a tense struggle with Aziz, he eventually has him ensnared on the end of one of the plane's missiles, which Harry fires at a terrorist helicopter, killing Aziz and the remnants of Crimson Jihad. Harry, Helen, and Dana are then safely reunited.

A year later, Harry and Helen are working together as Omega agents. While on a mission at a formal party, they encounter Simon, working as a waiter and pretending to be a spy as before. He runs away in fear after they reveal themselves and threaten to kill him. They dance a passionate tango while waiting for their contact and with Gib pleading with them to take their work seriously.

Cast

 Arnold Schwarzenegger as Harry Tasker
 Jamie Lee Curtis as Helen Tasker
 Tom Arnold as Albert "Gib" Gibson
 Art Malik as Salim Abu Aziz
 Bill Paxton as Simon
 Tia Carrere as Juno Skinner
 Eliza Dushku as Dana Tasker
 Grant Heslov as Faisil
 Charlton Heston as Spencer Trilby
 Marshall Manesh as Jamal Khaled
 James Allen as Colonel
 Ofer Samra as Yusef

Production
Schwarzenegger quickly slid off the horse and a stuntman caught him; he concluded, "[this is] why I will always love stunt people". Art Malik said he was drawn to the script's "pantomime quality” and the chance to work with director James Cameron. Costing $100–120 million to produce, True Lies was the first film with a production budget of over $100 million. It was filmed over a seven-month schedule.

Eliza Dushku stated that while filming True Lies at the age of twelve, she was sexually molested by the film's stunt coordinator, Joel Kramer. According to Dushku, soon after that, an adult friend of hers confronted Kramer on set, and that same day, Dushku was injured during a stunt and several of her ribs were broken, while Kramer was responsible for her safety. Kramer has denied the accusation of sexual misconduct. Dushku's co-stars Arnold Schwarzenegger, Jamie Lee Curtis, Tom Arnold, and director James Cameron all voiced support and admiration for Dushku's bravery.

Of the many locations that were used in the film, the Rosecliff Mansion was used for the ballroom tango scenes in the beginning of the film and the exterior of the Swiss chalet that Harry Tasker infiltrates is Ochre Court. The ballroom dancing scene that closes the film, as well as the scenes in the lobby of the fictional Hotel Marquis in Washington, take place in the Crystal Ballroom of the Millennium Biltmore Hotel in downtown Los Angeles. The outdoor structures used by Aziz's smuggling ring as a base of operations were a series of custom made Alaska Structures fabric buildings, leased to the production crew during filming.

Music
This was the first film to use the 1994 20th Century Fox logo and fanfare composed by Bruce Broughton.

Soundtrack

Songs appearing in the film not included on the soundtrack album:
 "I Never Thought I'd See the Day" – Sade
 "More Than a Woman" – Bee Gees
 "The Blue Danube" – The Philadelphia Orchestra
 "Por una Cabeza" – Argentinean tango, performed by The Tango Project

Reception

Box office
True Lies was a box-office success. Opening in 2,368 theaters in the United States and Canada, it ranked number one at the US box office in its opening weekend, grossing $25,869,770 and beating Forrest Gump. Once Forrest Gump returned to the top of the box office the following week, True Lies dropped into second place, earning $20.7 million. It was the number one film in Japan for twelve straight weeks. It went on to gross $146,282,411 in the United States and Canada and $232,600,000 in the rest of world, totaling $378,882,411 worldwide, making it the third-highest-grossing film of 1994, after Forrest Gump and The Lion King.

Critical reception
On the review aggregator website Rotten Tomatoes, the film holds an approval rating of 70% based on 53 reviews, and an average score of 6.60/10. The website's critical consensus reads, "If it doesn't reach the heights of director James Cameron's and star Arnold Schwarzenegger's previous collaborations, True Lies still packs enough action and humor into its sometimes absurd plot to entertain". On Metacritic, the film has a weighted average score of 63 out of 100 based on reviews from 17 critics, indicating "generally favorable reviews". Audiences polled by CinemaScore gave the film an average grade of "A" on an A+ to F scale.

Roger Ebert of the Chicago Sun-Times gave the film three stars out of four, writing, "It's stuff like that we go to Arnold Schwarzenegger movies for, and True Lies has a lot of it: laugh-out-loud moments when the violence is so cartoonish we don't take it seriously, and yet are amazed at its inventiveness and audacity." He wrote that he found the plot "perfunctory", but praised the film's stunts and special effects.

The film received criticism for its portrayal of Middle Easterners and its treatment of female characters. John Simon of the National Review criticized the plot line of the hero character (Schwarzenegger) using his agency's resources to stalk and frighten his wife as cruel and misogynistic. In a negative review, Kenneth Turan of the Los Angeles Times wrote:

Some Arabs and Muslims perceived the film as conveying strong anti-Arab or anti-Muslim prejudice, with some Arab-American advocacy groups calling for its banning in Arab countries.

In a 2022 retrospective review, Polish writer Jacek Szafranowicz called the film "a masterpiece of cinematic fun", noting that the collaboration between the director and its main star "deserves a golden medal". Commenting on the state of blockbuster films, Scott Tobias of The Guardian and The A.V. Club wrote, "True Lies is the strange case of a film that’s alternately retrograde, forward-looking, and thoroughly of its time. For better or worse, it’s a marker of how the Hollywood action blockbuster had advanced in 1994, as well as a commentary (intended or not) on the troubled state of American masculinity, marital relationships, and lingering racial attitudes."

Accolades

Year-end lists 
 4th – David Stupich, The Milwaukee Journal
 Top 3 Runner-ups (not ranked) – Sandi Davis, The Oklahoman
 Top 10 (listed alphabetically, not ranked) – Mike Clark, USA Today
 Top 10 (listed alphabetically, not ranked) – Jimmy Fowler, Dallas Observer
 Honorable mention – Michael MacCambridge, Austin American-Statesman
 Honorable mention – Dan Craft, The Pantagraph
 5th worst – Glenn Lovell, San Jose Mercury News
 Top 10 worst (listed alphabetically, not ranked) – Mike Mayo, The Roanoke Times
 Top 10 worst (listed alphabetically, not ranked) – William Arnold, Seattle Post-Intelligencer

Awards and nominations

Censorship
On October 1, 1994, True Lies was recalled from Indonesian movie theaters due to the film spawning controversy that focused on Muslim leaders insulting Islam and portraying themselves as religious extremists. According to the Council of Muslim Scholars, it led people to hate Arab terrorists defending the interests of some Islamic nations, but justified American terrorism. Earlier that year, officials had already banned Schindler's List from the country because it contained too much violence and nudity.

Home media
True Lies was released on VHS on January 10, 1995 and on LaserDisc a month later on February 8. It was the second LaserDisc release to feature a Dolby Digital AC-3 track, after Clear and Present Danger. On August 20, 1996, the film was released on a THX certified Widescreen Series VHS release, along with Speed, The Abyss and The Last of the Mohicans. It was then released on DVD on May 25, 1999. A high definition version was released on D-Theater in 2003. The film is currently unavailable for digital purchase. In 2018, James Cameron stated that a new transfer for Blu-ray has been completed, but he hasn't found time to review it.

Cancelled sequel
In April 1997, Arnold Schwarzenegger and Tom Arnold met with Cameron and discussed the possibility of an eventual True Lies sequel, which would also bring back Curtis in her role. At the time, Cameron was busy working on Titanic. Following the release of Titanic in late 1997, Cameron was planning to begin work on a True Lies sequel early the following year. Schwarzenegger and Arnold were expected to reprise their roles. Cameron conducted a search for a writer to work on True Lies 2. In August 1999, Cameron and 20th Century Fox were negotiating to have Jeff Eastin write the script under Cameron's supervision. At the time, the film was being planned for a mid-2001 release, with Cameron expected to direct it. By the end of 1999, there was the possibility that filming would begin in the third quarter of 2000. However, development of the script was ongoing as of June 2000. Cameron planned to produce True Lies 2 with Fox, but was undecided at that time on whether he would also direct it, as he wanted to wait until the script was complete. Eastin worked with Cameron on the project for approximately a year and a half, and Schwarzenegger and Arnold liked Eastin's script.

By March 2001, the script had been completed, and Curtis was confirmed to reprise her role alongside Schwarzenegger and Arnold. Following the September 11 attacks, Schwarzenegger said in January 2002, "We'll shoot it next year. We have a good script. There does need to be some changes because it deals with some terrorist act of some sort. But it's pretty much done." Later in 2002, Cameron said the film would not be made following the September 11 attacks: "Terrorism is no longer something to take as lightly as we did in the first one. I just can't see it happening given the current world climate."

In June 2003, Schwarzenegger said that after the attacks, "Cameron was worried because there's an airplane scene – a terrific airplane scene – that didn't have anything to do with the terrorism that we had in 9/11, but it was a great fight scene inside the plane while the plane goes down and this kind of thing. It was a very important moment in the movie, and he felt like he can't do that and therefore has to rewrite it ... These things take a long time." The following month, Curtis said the film would never be made due to the September 11 attacks: "Terrorists aren't funny anymore. They never were, but, it was distant enough from our psyche that we could make it funny. It'll never be funny again. I just think that that is over, that kind of humor is over." Eastin cited Schwarzenegger's 2003 election as California governor as another reason that True Lies 2 did not get made. However, Arnold remained optimistic that the film would be made.

In 2005, Arnold said he had met with Cameron, Curtis, Paxton, and Dushku to discuss True Lies 2. Arnold said the project would include the return of Schwarzenegger and that filming would begin once his role as California governor was concluded. Cameron said in 2009 that there were no plans to make the film, and Curtis, in 2019, reiterated her previous comments: "I don't think we could ever do another True Lies after 9/11." Art Malik concurred, saying during the time of True Lies' filming, "there was an element of fanaticism brewing and anti-West feeling going on. But I don't think any of us took any of it as seriously as we had to after 9/11. I think one of the reasons for that is probably the reason True Lies 2 was never made.”

In the 2005 film The Kid & I, Tom Arnold plays a fictional character based on himself. In that film, the character had starred in True Lies and is pursued by a fan and teams up with Henry Winkler and Linda Hamilton to make a sequel; Schwarzenegger and Curtis cameo as themselves.

Other media

Video games
Shortly after the film's release, video games based on the film of the same name were released for the Super Nintendo Entertainment System, Sega Genesis, Game Gear and Game Boy platforms.

Television

On February 10, 2021, CBS announced a pilot order for the True Lies series adaptation. Matt Nix wrote the pilot and produce with Josh Levy via Flying Glass of Milk Productions. James Cameron, director of the film, executive produced with Rae Sanchini through Lightstorm Entertainment. Mary Viola of Wonderland Sound and Vision also executive produced, with Corey Marsh of Wonderland co-executive producing. McG was set to direct the pilot and executive produce via Wonderland. In March 2021, CBS moved the pilot "off cycle" to give the series producers more time to film the pilot later in the year.

By May 2022, Anthony Hemingway replaced McG as the director of the pilot and subsequent episodes, via Anthony Hemingway Productions, to air by the 2022–23 broadcast season at CBS. Steve Howey and Ginger Gonzaga were cast in the lead roles, while Erica Hernandez, Omar Miller, Mike O'Gorman, Annabella Didion, and Lucas Jaye round out the supporting roles. On May 13, 2022, CBS officially picked up the series. The series was scheduled to premiere on February 23, 2023, however, it was delayed to March 1, 2023.

Notes

References

External links

 
 

1994 films
1994 action comedy films
1990s chase films
1990s spy comedy films
American action comedy films
American chase films
American remakes of French films
American spy comedy films
1990s English-language films
Films adapted into television shows
Films about child abduction in the United States
Films about families
Films about jihadism
Films about kidnapping
Films about nuclear war and weapons
Films about terrorism in the United States
Films directed by James Cameron
Films featuring a Best Musical or Comedy Actress Golden Globe winning performance
Films produced by James Cameron
Films scored by Brad Fiedel
Films set in Maryland
Films set in Miami
Films set in Washington, D.C.
Films with screenplays by James Cameron
Lightstorm Entertainment films
20th Century Fox films
Universal Pictures films
1990s American films